Borisoglebsky is an urban locality (an urban-type settlement) and the administrative center of Borisoglebsky District of Yaroslavl Oblast, Russia, located on the Ustye River,  from Rostov and  southwest of Yaroslavl. Population:  4,600 (1968).

The settlement's principal tourist attraction is the famous Borisoglebsky Monastery, now a museum. The monastery is named after Saints Boris and Gleb. The monastery was favored by Ivan the Terrible who personally supervised the construction of towered walls and bell-tower around an even more ancient cathedral. The only addition made to the monastery after Ivan's death is a superb carved barbican church, commissioned by the metropolitan Iona Sysoevich in the late 17th century.

In 2005, the statues of monk Peresvet (by Zurab Tsereteli) and of Prince Pozharsky were installed near the monastery walls.

References

External links
Views of the monastery
The Monastery of Sts Boris and Gleb 

Urban-type settlements in Yaroslavl Oblast
Borisoglebsky District, Yaroslavl Oblast
Rostovsky Uyezd (Yaroslavl Governorate)
Russian Orthodox monasteries in Russia